Roberta is a feminine version of the given name Robert.

People with the name
Roberta Achtenberg (born 1950), American attorney
Roberta Alaimo, Italian politician
Roberta Alenius (born 1978), Swedish politician
Roberta Alexander (born 1949), American operatic soprano
Roberta Allen (born 1945), American conceptual artist
Roberta Anastase (born 1976), Romanian politician
Roberta Joan Anderson (born 1943), birth name of Canadian–American singer-songwriter Joni Mitchell
Roberta Angelilli (born 1965), Italian politician
Roberta Annan (born 1982), Ghanaian investor and philanthropist
Roberta Arnold (1896–1966), American stage and silent film actress
Roberta A. Ballard, American pediatrician
Roberta Baskin, American journalist and non-profit director
Roberta Bayley, American photographer
Roberta Bianconi (born 1989), Italian water polo player
Roberta Bitgood (1908–2007), American organist, choir director and classical composer
Roberta Bonanomi (born 1966), Italian road racing cyclist
Roberta Bondar (born 1945), Canadian astronaut
Roberta Brunet (born 1965), Italian athlete
Roberta Bruni (born 1994), Italian pole vaulter
Roberta Byrd Barr (1919–1993), American civil rights activist, educator and librarian
Roberta Capua (born 1968), Italian television host, actress, model and beauty pageant titleholder
Roberta Close (born 1964), Brazilian fashion model
Roberta Colindrez, Mexican–American actress and playwright
Roberta Collins (born 1944), American actress
Roberta F. Colman (1938–2019), American biochemist
Roberta Cordano (born 1963), American lawyer
Roberta Cowing (1860–1924), American artist and scientific illustrator
Roberta Crenshaw (1914–2005), American civic leader and philanthropist
Roberta Dapunt (born 1970), Italian poet
Roberta Del Core (born 1964), Italian rower
Roberta Degnore (born 1946), American author, filmmaker and psychologist
Roberta Dodd Crawford (1897–1954), American lyric soprano
Roberta Donnay (born 1966), American jazz singer
Roberta Dunbar, American clubwoman and peace activist
Roberta Eike, American oceanographer and marine geologist
Roberta Einer, Estonian fashion designer
Roberta Faccani (born 1968), Italian singer and actress
Roberta Faccin (born 1957), Italian basketball player
Roberta Farinelli (born 1975), Italian swimmer
Roberta Farrell, American–New Zealand biotechnologist
Roberta M. Feldman, American architect and professor
Roberta Felotti (born 1964), Italian swimmer
Roberta Fernández, Tejana novelist
Roberta Fiandino (born 1985), Italian biathlete
Roberta Findlay (born 1948), American filmmaker
Roberta Flack (born 1937), American jazz and folk singer
Roberta Foster, Barbadian dressage rider
Roberta Fox (1943–2009), American attorney and politician
Roberta Fulbright (1874–1953), American businesswoman
Roberta Freeman, American singer
Roberta Gale (1914–2008), American actress
Roberta Gambarini, Italian jazz singer
Roberta Geddes-Harvey (1849–1930), Canadian choirmaster, composer and organist
Roberta Gellis (1927–2016), American writer
Roberta Gemma (born 1980), Italian pornographic actress
Roberta Gentini (born 1973), Italian equestrian
Roberta Geremicca (born 1984), Italian actress
Roberta Gilchrist (born 1965), Canadian archaeologist
Roberta González, French painter
Roberta Gottlieb, American academic and oncologist
Roberta Gregory (born 1953), American comic book writer and artist
Roberta Groner (born 1978), American long distance runner
Roberta Gropper (1897–1993), German political activist
Roberta Grossman (born 1959), American filmmaker
Roberta Guaspari (born 1947), American violinist and music educator
Roberta Guerrina, English political scientist
Roberta Hamme, Canadian chemical oceanographer
Roberta Hanley, American actress and director
Roberta Haynes (1927–2019), American actress
Roberta L. Hazard (1934–2017), American Navy officer
Roberta Helmer (1950–2018), American romance author
Roberta Hill Whiteman (born 1947), Oneida poet
Roberta Hodes (1927–2021), American film producer and script supervisor
Roberta Hoskie, American real estate broker
Roberta Howett (born 1981), Irish singer
Roberta Hubley (born 1941), Canadian politician
Roberta M. Humphreys (born 1944), American observational stellar astrophysicist
Roberta Hyson, American actress and dancer
Roberta Invernizzi (born 1966), Italian soprano and music teacher
Roberta Jamieson, Canadian First Nations activist and lawyer
Roberta Jull (1872–1961), Scottish–Australian medical doctor
Roberta Kalechofsky (1931–2022), American feminist, writer and animal rights activist
Roberta Kaplan (born 1966), American lawyer and co-founder of Time's Up Legal Defense Fund
Roberta Karmel (born 1937), American attorney
Roberta Kelly (born 1942), American gospel singer
Roberta Kerr (born 1952), English actress
Roberta Kevelson (1931–1998), American academic and semiotician
Roberta Klatzky (born 1947), American psychology professor
Roberta Knie (1938–2017), American dramatic soprano
Roberta Lange (born 1957), American politician
Roberta Langtry (1916–2005), Canadian elementary school teacher and philanthropist
Roberta Lannes (born 1948), American horror writer
Roberta Lanzarotti (born 1968), Italian swimmer
Roberta Latow (1931–2003), American erotic author, gallery owner and interior designer
Roberta Lawson (1878–1940), Lenape activist, musician and community organizer
Roberta Leigh (1926–2014), English author, composer and television producer
Roberta Lepper (born 1978), Fijian sailor
Roberta Lima (born 1974), Brazilian–Austrian video and performance artist
Roberta Linn (born 1931), American singer
Roberta Lobeira Alanís (born 1979), Mexican painter and visual artist
Roberta Lombardi (born 1973), Italian politician
Roberta Lucca (born 1978), Brazilian–English entrepreneur and co-founder of Bossa Studios
Roberta MacAdams (1880–1959), Canadian politician and military dietician
Roberta MacGlashan, American politician
Roberta Mancino (born 1980), Italian skydiver and wingsuit flyer
Roberta Marques (born 1968), Brazilian film director, producer and screenwriter
Roberta Marquez, Brazilian ballet dancer
Roberta Marrero (born 1972), Spanish actress and singer
Roberta Marinelli, American oceanographer
Roberta Martin (1907–1969), American gospel composer, singer, pianist, arranger, and choral organizer
Roberta Marzani (born 1996), Italian fencer
Roberta Materi (born 1975), Canadian curler
Roberta Maxwell (born 1941), Canadian actress
Roberta McCain (1912–2020), American socialite and oil heiress
Roberta McCallum (born 1958), American tennis player
Roberta McRae (born 1948), Italian–Australian politician
Roberta Metsola (born 1979), Maltese politician
Roberta Michnick Golinkoff, American academic and author
Roberta Millstein, American philosophy professor
Roberta Miranda (born 1956), Brazilian singer
Roberta Monaldini, Sammarinese road cyclist
Roberta Moretti Avery (born 1985), Brazilian cricketer
Roberta Morris Purdee, American documentarian and film producer
Roberta Naas (born 1958), American author and journalist
Roberta J. Nichols (1931–2005), American engineer
Roberta O'Brien, Irish Navy officer
Roberta Panara (born 1984), Italian swimmer
Roberta Pedranzini (born 1971), Italian ski mountaineer
Roberta Pelosi (born 1960), Italian sport shooter
Roberta Peters (1930–2017), American coloratura soprano
Roberta Piket (born 1965), American jazz pianist, organist, arranger and composer
Roberta Pinotti (born 1961), Italian politician
Roberta Rabellotti, Italian economics professor
Roberta Ratzke (born 1990), Brazilian volleyball player
Roberta L. Raymond (1938–2019), American actress and sociologist
Roberta Rees (born 1954), Canadian poet and writer
Roberta Richman (born 1941), American painter, printmaker and corrections administrator
Roberta Rodeghiero (born 1990), Italian figure skater
Roberta Rodrigues (born 1982), Brazilian actress and singer
Roberta Rogow (born 1942), American fanfiction writer
Roberta Romano, American law professor
Roberta Rosenthal Kwall, American law professor
Roberta Rudnick (born 1958), American geologist and professor
Roberta Sá, Brazilian singer
Roberta Seelinger Trites (born 1962), American English Literature professor
Roberta Serra (born 1970), Italian alpine skier
Roberta Sessoli (born 1963), Italian chemistry professor
Roberta Semple Salter (1910–2007), American evangelist, daughter of Aimee Semple McPherson
Roberta I. Shaffer (born 1953), American attorney and librarian
Roberta Shepherd (born 1934), Australian physiotherapist
Roberta Sheridan (1864–1918), American teacher
Roberta Sherwood (1913–1999), American singer
Roberta Shore (born 1943), American actress
Roberta Sigel (1916–2008), American political scientist
Roberta Silva (born 1971), Trinidadian artist
Roberta Sinatra, Italian professor and scientist
Roberta Sklar, American activist and theater director
Roberta Smith (born 1948), American art critic
Roberta Tamondong (born 2002), Filipino actress, model and beauty pageant titleholder
Roberta Taylor (born 1948), English actress and author
Roberta Teale Swartz (1903–1993), American academic, poet and co-founder of the Kenyon Review
Roberta Temes, American author and psychotherapist
Roberta Thornley (born 1985), New Zealand photographer
Roberta Tomber (1954–2022), English archaeologist
Roberta Torre (born 1962), Italian director and screenwriter
Roberta Tovey (born 1953), English actress
Roberta Valderrama (born 1977), Peruvian actress
Roberta Vinci (born 1983), Italian tennis player
Roberta Voss (born 1965), American politician
Roberta Washington, American architect
Roberta Weiss (born 1961), Canadian actress
Roberta Williams (born 1953), American video game designer and writer
Roberta Wilson (1896–1977), American silent film actress
Roberta Whyte (1897–1979), English Royal Air Force nursing administrator
Roberta Wohlstetter (1912–2007), American military historian
Roberta Woodgate (born 1956), Canadian nurse
Roberta Zambrano (born 1971), Ecuadorian politician

Fictional characters
Rosarita "Roberta" Cisneros, from the anime and manga series Black Lagoon
Roberta Tubbs, from the animated series The Cleveland Show

English feminine given names
Germanic feminine given names
Bulgarian feminine given names
Italian feminine given names
Romanian feminine given names
Sammarinese given names